Rumona Morris (born 5 June 1993) is a Papua New Guinean footballer who plays as a midfielder. She has been a member of the Papua New Guinea women's national football team.

Football career

Morris is from Madang. Morris first represented Papua New Guinea in the women's under-15 football team in 2010, and at the 2010 Youth Olympic Games in Singapore. She has captained the Papua New Guinea women's national under-20 football team. As of 2021, she had played for the senior team on 14 occasions. She missed the 2015 Pacific Games due to study commitments.

In 2021 she was awarded the Southern Conference Most Valuable Player award. That year, she returned to the Papua New Guinea squad for their 2023 FIFA Women's World Cup qualification matches.

Rugby career
In March 2014, Morris was named to the training squad for the Papua New Guinea women's national rugby sevens team to contest the Hong Kong Sevens event. She later switched to rugby union.

Personal life
Her father Bob Morris is manager of the Papua New Guinea men's team.

Notes

References

External links

1993 births
Living people
Papua New Guinean women's footballers
Women's association football midfielders
Papua New Guinea women's international footballers